Nicolás Pavlovich (born 14 February 1978) is an Argentine football coach and a former striker. He is an assistant coach with Newell's Old Boys. He has played professional football in Argentina, Russia, Germany and Mexico.

Career
Pavlovich started his career with Newell's Old Boys in 1998, he joined Racing Club in 2002.

In 2003, Pavlovich was signed by Russian club FC Saturn where he played until 2005. He then had brief spells with Kaiserslautern in Germany and Morelia in Mexico before returning to Argentina in 2007 to play for Club Atlético Banfield.

In 2008, he joined Argentinos Juniors on a year-long loan, with an option to buy. He was an important member of the Argentinos Juniors team that won the Clausura 2010 championship, playing in 18 of the club's 19 games and scoring six goals during the championship winning campaign.

Honours
Argentinos Juniors
 Argentine Primera División (1): Clausura 2010

References

External links
 Argentine Primera statistics at Fútbol XXI  
 Football-Lineups player profile

1978 births
Living people
People from Balcarce Partido
Sportspeople from Buenos Aires Province
Argentine footballers
Argentine people of Croatian descent
Argentine people of Serbian descent
Association football forwards
Newell's Old Boys footballers
Racing Club de Avellaneda footballers
FC Saturn Ramenskoye players
Russian Premier League players
1. FC Kaiserslautern players
Atlético Morelia players
Club Necaxa footballers
Club Atlético Banfield footballers
Argentinos Juniors footballers
Club Libertad footballers
Argentine Primera División players
2. Bundesliga players
Liga MX players
Argentine expatriate footballers
Expatriate footballers in Russia
Expatriate footballers in Germany
Expatriate footballers in Mexico
Expatriate footballers in Paraguay
Expatriate footballers in Chile
Argentino de Rosario footballers